Diane Lockward is an American poet. The author of four full-length books of poetry, Lockward serves as the Poet Laureate of West Caldwell, New Jersey.

Biography 
Diane Lockward earned her bachelor's degree from Elmira College and her master's from Montclair State University. She is the author of four full-length books of poetry: The Uneaten Carrots of Atonement (2016), Temptation by Water (2010), What Feeds Us (2006), recipient of the Quentin R. Howard Poetry Prize, and Eve's Red Dress (2003), all from Wind Publications. She is also the author/editor of four poetry craft books, The Strategic Poet: Honing the Craft, The Practicing Poet: Writing Beyond the Basics (Terrapin Books, 2018), The Crafty Poet II: A Portable Workshop (Terrapin Books, 2016) and The Crafty Poet: A Portable Workshop (rev. ed., Terrapin Books, 2016), and two chapbooks, Eve Argues Against Perfection (1997) and Greatest Hits: 1997-2010 (2012). Her poems have been published in Prairie Schooner, Spoon River Poetry Review, Poet Lore, Harvard Review, and elsewhere. Her poems have also been featured on Poetry Daily, Verse Daily, Gwarlingo, American Life in Poetry, and The Writer's Almanac. She is the recipient of a Poetry Fellowship from the New Jersey State Council on the Arts and a Woman of Achievement Award. She serves as the Poet Laureate of West Caldwell, New Jersey. She founded the Poetry Festival: A Celebration of Literary Journals in 2004 and served as its director for twelve years. A former high school English teacher at Millburn High School, she has also worked as a poet-in-the-schools for the New Jersey State Council on the Arts and the Geraldine R. Dodge Foundation.  She is the founder and publisher of Terrapin Books, a small press for poetry books. She lives in northern New Jersey.

Works

Books 
 
 
 
 
 
 
 Eve Argues Against Perfection (1997)

Anthologies 
 Poetry Daily: 366 Poems from the World's Most Popular Poetry Website
 Good Poems for Hard Times
 In a Fine Frenzy: Poets Respond to Shakespeare
 The Working Poet: 75 Writing Exercises and a Poetry Anthology
 The Poet's Cookbook
 Poem, Home: An Anthology of Ars Poetica
 Eating Her Wedding Dress: A Collection of Clothing Poems
 White Ink: Poems on Mothers and Motherhood
 Sweeping Beauty: Contemporary Women Poets Do Housework
 Family Matters: Poems of Our Families
 The Breath of Parted Lips
 Poetry: A Pocket Anthology
 Mischief, Caprice and Other Poetic Strategies
 Inside Literature: Reading, Responding, Arguing

Textbooks 
 Wingbeats, Vol. 2 (Dos Gatos, 2014)
 The Compact Bedford Introduction to Literature (Bedford/St. Martin's, 2014)
 Literature to Go (Bedford/St. Martin's, 2013)
 Poetry: An Introduction (Bedford/St. Martin's, 2013)
 The Bedford Introduction to Literature: Reading, Thinking, Writing (Bedford/St. Martin's, 2013)
 Inside Literature: Reading, Responding, Arguing (Penguin Academics, 2007)
 Getting the Knack: 20 Poetry Writing Exercises (National Council of Teachers of English, 1992)

Honors 
 Poetry Fellowship, 2003, from the New New Jersey State Council on the Arts
 Quentin R. Howard Poetry Prize for What Feeds Us, 2006
 Sunday Poet at Gwarlingo
 First Prize Winner in 2012 Naugatuck River Review Poetry Contest
 Featured Poet at 2007 Burlington Book Festival
 Featured Poet at 2016 and 2006 Geraldine R. Dodge Poetry Festival
 Featured Poet at 2005 Frost Place Conference on Poetry and Teaching
 Featured Poet at 2001 Warren County Poetry Festival
 Featured Poet at Valparaiso Poetry Review
 Featured Poet at Poetry Southeast
 The Missing Wife on Verse Daily
 Birdhouse on Verse Daily
 Seventh-Grade Science Project on Poetry Daily
 My Husband Discovers Poetry on The Writer's Almanac
 Linguini on The Writer's Almanac
 Blueberry on The Writer's Almanac
 The First Artichoke on The Writer's Almanac
 Idiosyncrasies of the Body in 2008 Best of the Net, selected by Dorianne Laux

References

 Official Website
 Terrapin Books
 List of Poets
 Suburban Essex Magazine
 Writer's Digest
 Harvard Review
 Al.com
 Chatham Courier
 Poets & Writers Directory of Writers

External links

 Pyromania in Prairie Schooner
 Hunger in the Garden in Valparaiso Poetry Review
 Three Poems in Escape into Life
 Six poems read by Garrison Keillor on The Writer's Almanac

Montclair State University alumni
American women poets
Elmira College alumni
Municipal Poets Laureate in the United States
Poets from New Jersey
Living people
Year of birth missing (living people)
21st-century American women